After a tree has been cut and felled, the stump or tree stump is usually a small remaining portion of the trunk with the roots still in the ground. Stumps may show the age-defining rings of a tree. The study of these rings is known as dendrochronology.

Regeneration 
Stumps (both those on the ground and stumps of removed branches) are sometimes able to regenerate into new trees depending on the species. Often, a deciduous tree that has been cut will re-sprout in multiple places around the edge of the stump or from the roots. Depending on whether the tree is being removed or whether the forest is expected to recover, this can be either desirable or undesirable. Stump sprouts can grow very quickly and so become viable trees themselves either for aesthetics or timber, due to the existing root structure; however, the cut portion of the trunk may weaken the sprouts and introduce disease into the newly forming tree(s).

The process of deliberately cutting a tree to a stump to regrow is known as coppicing.

Stump removal 
Tree stumps can be difficult to remove from the ground. They can be dug out, pulled out by a chain, shredded with a stump grinder or burnt.

A common method for stump removal is to use one of the many chemical stump removal products, so long as immediate results are not needed. These stump removers are mostly made of potassium nitrate (KNO3) and act by rapidly increasing the decay of the stump. (The chemical provides nitrogen, a limiting nutrient, to tree-decaying fungi. Other nitrogen fertilizers also work.) After an average of 4–6 weeks, the stump will be rotten through and easily fragmented in manageable pieces. If time is a limiting factor, setting fire to the stump is effective because once the potassium nitrate has been absorbed it acts as an effective oxidizer.

Historically, an explosive called stumping powder was used to blast stumps.

Stump harvesting 

In plantation forests in parts of Europe, stumps are sometimes pulled out of the ground using a specially adapted tracked excavator, to supply wood fuel for biomass power stations. Stump harvesting may provide an increasing component of the woody material required by the biomass power sector.

See also

Living stump

References

 Buckley, G.P. 1992. Ecology and Management of Coppice Woodlands. Springer 336 pages,, .
 Schenk, H.J., and R.B. Jackson. 2002. The global biogeography of roots. Ecological Monographs 72 (3): 311–328.

External links

.  Stump removal service

 Stump harvesting in Sweden
 Regeneration after stump harvesting 
 Stumps as a resource in Finland
 Stump harvesting and forest decomposers 
 Stump Removal Methods Comparison

Stump
Forest ecology
Dead wood